The Partridge River is a river in northern Cochrane District in Northeastern Ontario, Canada. It is a tributary of James Bay situated in between the much larger drainage basins of the Moose River to the west and the Harricana River to the east.

Course
The river begins at Partridge Lake, adjacent to the much larger Kesagami Lake on the Kesagami River, part of Harricana River drainage basin. It exits the lake at the east and turns north, then jogs west through the Kanatotik Rapids before again heading north and passing around Blackbear Island. It continues north around Kaskagonagau Island and Mistikopileo Island, takes in the right tributary Little Partridge River, and reaches its mouth at James Bay.

Tributaries
Little Partridge River (right)
Paskeyau Creek (right)
Marberg Creek (right)
Malastikweyau Creek (left)
Glaister Creek (right)

See also
List of rivers of Ontario

References

Sources

Rivers of Cochrane District